The Innocent Man is an American true crime documentary television series based on John Grisham's 2006 book The Innocent Man: Murder and Injustice in a Small Town. The six-episode first season debuted on Netflix on December 14, 2018.

Like Grisham's nonfiction book, the series follows two murder cases in Ada, Oklahoma, between 1982 and 1984. The cases examine the potential false confessions of Ron Williamson, Dennis Fritz, Tommy Ward, and Karl Fontenot.

Episodes

Reception 
Upon its release, the show received mixed reviews from critics. On the review aggregator Rotten Tomatoes, the series has a 69% approval rating based on 13 reviews, with an average rating of 7.0 out of 10. The site's critical consensus says, "The Innocent Man will satisfy true crime aficionados looking for a slickly packaged mystery, but viewers seeking a more probing deconstruction of the justice system may come away disappointed." On Metacritic, the series has a weighted score of 57 out of 100, based on 4 critics, indicating "mixed or average reviews".

See also 

 List of wrongful convictions in the United States

References

External links
  on Netflix
 

2018 American television series debuts
2018 American television series endings
2010s American documentary television series
English-language Netflix original programming
Netflix original documentary television series
Documentary television series about crime in the United States